Henry Gear was a business and politician in Newfoundland. He represented Burin in the Newfoundland House of Assembly from 1894 to 1897 and from 1900 to 1913.

The son of George Gear, he was born in St. John's. In 1880, he took over control of his father's business, operating in partnership with W. J. Barnes as Gear and Company. The company manufactured and imported various items. A few years later, Gaar opened a second business, H. Gear and Company.

He was first elected to the Newfoundland assembly in an 1894 by-election. Gear was defeated when he ran for reelection in 1897 but was reelected in 1900, serving until his defeat in 1913. He served in the cabinet as a minister without portfolio from 1904 to 1909.

His son Ernest also served in the Newfoundland assembly and was the last person elected to the assembly from the Dominion of Newfoundland.

References 

Members of the Newfoundland and Labrador House of Assembly
Year of birth missing
Year of death missing
Government ministers of the Dominion of Newfoundland
Newfoundland Colony people